Brevard County Cocoa Expos is an American women's soccer team, founded in 1993. The team is a member of the Women's Premier Soccer League, the third tier of women's soccer in the United States and Canada. The team plays in the Sunshine Conference.

The team plays its home games at the Cocoa Municipal Stadium in Cocoa, Florida. The club's colors are blue and white.

The team used to play in the USL W-League as the Cocoa Expos Women, and were associated with the now defunct men's USL team, Cocoa Expos.

Players

Current roster

Notable former players
  Joanne Love 
  Emily McColl
  Liz Hansen (2007-9 Doncaster Rovers Belles L.F.C. England)

Year-by-year

Honors
 WPSL Sunshine Conference Champions 2008

Competition History

Coaches
  James Kryger -present

Stadia
 Cocoa Municipal Stadium, Cocoa, Florida -present

Average Attendance

External links
 Official Site
 WPSL Brevard County Cocoa Expos page

   

Women's Premier Soccer League teams
Women's soccer clubs in the United States
Soccer clubs in Florida
USL W-League (1995–2015) teams
Sports in Brevard County, Florida
2006 establishments in Florida
Women's sports in Florida